Delta Sigma Iota is a collegiate, South Asian interest, multicultural, social, Greek Fraternity located in the United States.

History 
Delta Sigma Iota Fraternity, Inc. was founded on August 15, 2000 at the University Park Campus of The Pennsylvania State University.

Founding Fathers 
 Tarak Bhavsar
 Roby Palakudy
 Vishal Desai
 Rupesh Patel
 Vipul Patel

Philanthropy

SAMAR 
Established in 1992, South Asian Marrow Association of Recruiters (SAMAR) is a community based Network member of the National Marrow Donor Program (NMDP).

The Mission Statement for SAMAR is, "To create an informed society of individuals who would make a conscious decision to become committed volunteer marrow/blood stem cell donors and be available to donate marrow/blood stem cells if they match a patient."

Only With Consent 
The Mission Statement for Only With Consent is, "Dedicated to stopping sexual violence through consent and health education. We exist to provide resources to young people so that they can make healthy choices. By upsetting rape culture, and generating consent culture we will help create a safe space for people across the world. Our goals are to educate people of all ages about consent and encourage all people to take action. We are creating age-appropriate educational curriculum that can be used in schools across the country. This will open up dialogue around consent which is the first and most important step towards creating consent culture."

NAPA Council 
Delta Sigma Iota Fraternity Inc., on February 8, 2016, became an official member of The National Asian Pacific Islander American Panhellenic Association (NAPA)

The Mission Statement for National APIDA Panhellenic Association is, "Serves to advocate the needs of its member organizations and provides a forum to share ideas and resources within its members. NAPA supports the development of positive relations through open communication with interfraternal partners to enrich the fraternal experience."

The Vision Statement for National APIDA Panhellenic Association is, "NAPA organizations set the gold standard for APIDA fraternities and sororities. In addition to meeting the association’s base standards, NAPA member organizations are exposed to resources and expertise to help them continually improve and be the best they can be. Universities, Greek Councils, and students want the best APIDA fraternities and sororities on campus and they can find them in NAPA."

Chapters 
Chapters of Delta Sigma Iota include the following.  Those in bold are active, those in italics are dormant.
 Alpha: Pennsylvania State University - University Park
 Beta: University of North Carolina - Chapel Hill
 Gamma: North Carolina State University
 Delta: Rutgers University - New Brunswick
 Epsilon: Inactive 
 Zeta: Montclair State University
 Eta: Duke University
 Theta: Ohio State University
 Iota: University of North Carolina - Charlotte

References

External links 
 Official Website

Pennsylvania State University